WNJP (88.5 FM) is a radio station licensed to Sussex, New Jersey. The station is owned by New York Public Radio, and is an affiliate of their New Jersey Public Radio network. On July 1, 2011, WNYC assumed control of the stations that comprise NJPR under a management agreement.

References

External links

NJP
Radio stations established in 1998
NPR member stations
New York Public Radio